Michal Kabáč (born 1 December 1995) is a Slovak professional ice hockey player who currently plays professionally in Slovakia for HC '05 Banská Bystrica of the Slovak Extraliga.

Career statistics

Regular season and playoffs

International

References

External links

 

1995 births
Living people
HC '05 Banská Bystrica players
MHk 32 Liptovský Mikuláš players
MHC Martin players
Madison Capitols players
HK Dukla Michalovce players
Slovak ice hockey centres
People from Trstená
Sportspeople from the Žilina Region
Slovak expatriate ice hockey players in the United States